Caterina Scarpellini (29 October 1808 – 28 November 1873), was an  Italian astronomer who discovered a comet and as a meteorologist she established a station in Rome in the 1850s.

Life
She was born in Foligno on 29 October 1808, Scarpellini moved to Rome at the age of 18. She was an assistant to her uncle, who was the director of the Roman Campidoglio Observatory. She was a corresponding member of the Accademia dei Georgofili in Florence.

She discovered a comet on 1 April 1854 and established a meteorological station in Rome in 1856. In 1872 she was honored by the Italian government for her work; she died 28 November the following year.

One of the craters of Venus is named after her.

References

1808 births
1873 deaths
19th-century Italian astronomers
Women astronomers
19th-century Italian women scientists
People from Foligno